Belle Rose is a census-designated place (CDP) in Assumption Parish, Louisiana, United States. The population was 1,902 at the 2010 census. It is part of the Pierre Part Micropolitan Statistical Area.

Geography
Belle Rose is located at  (30.036834, -91.054039).

Demographics

As of the census of 2000, there were 1,944 people, 674 households, and 514 families residing in the CDP. The racial makeup of the CDP was 39.92% White, 59.83% African American, 0.15% Native American, and 0.10% from two or more races. Hispanic or Latino of any race were 1.34% of the population.

There were 674 households, out of which 34.7% had children under the age of 18 living with them, 50.0% were married couples living together, 20.2% had a female householder with no husband present, and 23.7% were non-families. 21.8% of all households were made up of individuals, and 10.7% had someone living alone who was 65 years of age or older. The average household size was 2.88 and the average family size was 3.36.

In the CDP, the population was spread out, with 27.4% under the age of 18, 10.3% from 18 to 24, 26.9% from 25 to 44, 22.0% from 45 to 64, and 13.4% who were 65 years of age or older. The median age was 35 years. For every 100 females, there were 92.9 males. For every 100 females age 18 and over, there were 84.1 males.

The median income for a household in the CDP was $30,313, and the median income for a family was $35,865. Males had a median income of $40,089 versus $24,583 for females. The per capita income for the CDP was $13,606. About 27.9% of families and 28.0% of the population were below the poverty line, including 33.7% of those under age 18 and 27.6% of those age 65 or over.

References

Census-designated places in Assumption Parish, Louisiana
Census-designated places in Louisiana